is a former Japanese football player.

Playing career
Mizusaki was born in Shizuoka Prefecture on June 13, 1971. After graduating from Kindai University, he joined Japan Football League club Cerezo Osaka in 1994. The club won the champions in 1994 and was promoted to J1 League. However he could hardly play in the match and retired end of 1996 season.

Club statistics

References

External links

1971 births
Living people
Kindai University alumni
Association football people from Shizuoka Prefecture
Japanese footballers
J1 League players
Japan Football League (1992–1998) players
Cerezo Osaka players
Association football midfielders